Sophie Bellon (born 1961) is a French businesswoman, and the chairwoman of Sodexo, a company founded by her father Pierre Bellon.

Early life
Sophie Bellon earned a degree from EDHEC business school in Paris in 1983.

Career
Bellon started her career with Crédit Lyonnais in New York.

Bellon had been a director of Sodexo since 1989, and succeeded her father as chair in January 2016.

Personal life
She was known as Sophie Clamens until her divorce. She has three grown-up children.

References

Living people
1961 births
20th-century French businesswomen
20th-century French businesspeople
French chairpersons of corporations
21st-century French businesswomen
21st-century French businesspeople